2034: A Novel of the Next World War is a 2021 novel written by Elliot Ackerman and James G. Stavridis.

Overview
A geopolitical thriller that imagines a naval clash between the United States and China in the South China Sea in the year 2034.

References

2021 novels
English-language novels
Thriller novels